McGrawville (also New Hudson) is a former hamlet in the town of New Hudson, Allegany County, New York, United States.

History
The hamlet was named for one Mr. McGraw, a local landowner. According to a local historian, the settlement grew as a village around a saw mill, and at one time included "a store, cheese factory, blacksmith shop, and ten or twelve dwellings" including tenement houses for workers on a stockraising farm, and a boarding house. It was the location of a U.S. Post Office for more than 50 years, from 1849 through about 1900.

Notes

Hamlets in Allegany County, New York
Hamlets in New York (state)